NCST may refer to:

 National Community Stabilization Trust in the United States
 National Centre for Software Technology in India, now Centre for Development of Advanced Computing (C-DAC)
 National College of Science and Technology in the Philippines
 New Castle School of Trades in the United States
 National Construction Safety Team in the United States, fielded as needed by NIST
 National Commission for Scheduled Tribes in India